is a 1956 Japanese drama film written and directed by Kaneto Shindo.

Cast
 Mie Kitahara as Chiho Teraoka
 Nobuko Otowa as Hagiyo, Chiho's mother
 Rentarō Mikuni as Ryūkichi Fukase
 Ranko Akagi as Yoshie, Ryūkichi's mother
 Sen Hara as Sama (as Senko Hara)
 Nobuo Kaneko as Takakura
 Sachiko Murase as Uta, Chiho's grand mother
 Terumi Niki
 Ichirō Sugai as Sōkichi, Ryūkichi's father
 Yoshiko Tsubouchi as Kuniko (as Mieko Tsubouchi)

References

External links
 

1956 films
Japanese drama films
1950s Japanese-language films
1956 drama films
Films directed by Kaneto Shindo
1950s Japanese films
Japanese black-and-white films